Hafiz Al-Hasan is a Bangladeshi cricketer. He made his List A debut for Partex Sporting Club in the 2016–17 Dhaka Premier Division Cricket League on 12 April 2017.

References

External links
 

Year of birth missing (living people)
Living people
Bangladeshi cricketers
Partex Sporting Club cricketers
Place of birth missing (living people)